Karachi–Peshawar Railway Line (also referred to as Main Line 1 or ML-1) is one of four main railway lines in Pakistan, operated and maintained by Pakistan Railways. The line begins from Karachi City station or Kiamari station and ends at Peshawar Cantonment Station. There are 184 railway stations from Kiamari to Peshawar Cantonment on this line. The line serves as the main passenger and freight line of the country. 75% of the country's cargo and passenger traffic uses the line. The line is currently undergoing a six-year  upgrade and renovation as part of the China Pakistan Economic Corridor, with average rail speeds expected be doubled to 160 kilometers per hour upon completion.

History

The present-day Karachi–Peshawar Railway Line was built as a patchwork of different railways during the British Raj in India during the 19th century. The present day line consists of the following historic sections built between 1861 and 1900:
 Karachi–Kotri section, opened in 1861 (Kotri Bridge over the Indus River, opened in 1899)
 Kotri–Rohri section, opened in 1900
 Rohri–Multan section, opened in 1879 (Empress Bridge (near Bahawalpur) over the Sutlej River, opened in 1878)
 Multan–Lahore section, opened in 1861
 Lahore–Peshawar section, opened in 1876 (Attock Bridge over the Indus River, opened in 1883)

Early development
The Scinde Railway was constructed in 1861 as a  broad gauge railway line between Karachi and Kotri. Work on the line had commenced in April 1858 and was the first railway line for public use in the region. Following the completion of the line, the Indus Steam Flotilla began docking in Kotri (instead of Karachi) from Multan. The Punjab Railway was constructed and inaugurated in late 1861 as a  broad gauge railway line between Multan and Lahore, and later extended to Amritsar. Thus the travel time between Sindh and Punjab was greatly reduced together with the Scinde Railway, Indus Steam Flotilla and Punjab Railways; what normally took 40 days to travel between Karachi and Lahore now took 48 hours to transport passengers and cargo.

Mergers & expansion
In 1870, the Scinde, Punjab & Delhi Railway was formed from the incorporation of the Scinde Railway, Indus Steam Flotilla, Punjab Railway and Delhi Railway companies in order to increase efficiency of passenger and cargo transport between Sindh and Punjab. However, the rail gap between Kotri and Multan was considered a hassle as the Indus River and Sutlej River were major obstacles to cross at the time. In 1871, the Indus Valley State Railway was inaugurated and construction began on extending the railway line from Multan south towards Bahawalpur (crossing the Sutlej River) and on wards to Rohri. In 1876, the Punjab Northern State Railway was constructed between Lahore and Peshawar and in 1883 the Attock Bridge over the Indus River was opened. In 1878, the Empress Bridge over the Sutlej River was opened and in 1879 the Indus Valley State Railway reached Rohri. From Rohri, a steam ferry would transport eight rail carriages at a time across the Indus between Rohri and Sukkur. This was found to be cumbersome and time-consuming. In 1889, the Lansdowne Bridge between Rohri and Sukkar was opened and in 1893, work on the Kotri Bridge commenced. It was only in 1900 that the section between Rohri and Kotri was completed. In 1885, all the companies were merged to form the North Western State Railway.

ML-1 upgrade
Since 2015 there has been a plan to expand and reconstruct the ML-1 main line, funded by Chinese loans, as part of the China–Pakistan Economic Corridor. The plan involves doubling the track from Karachi to Peshawar, providing grade separation, as well as communications-based train control.

The first phase is expected to cost of billion. In June 2016, China and Pakistan unveiled plans for the second phase of the project, with a total cost of billion for both phases of the project.

The first phase was expected to be completed by December 2017, with the second phase expected to be completed in 2021. The project has been delayed for years, with reports in January 2022 suggesting that there was o funding plan in place and China also reluctant to provide capital. As of 2023 the upgrade project has not been initiated.

Upgrading of the railway line will permit train travel at speeds of 160 kilometres per hour, versus the average 60 to 105 km per hour speed currently possible on existing track, and is expected to increase Pakistan Railways' annual revenues by approximately $480 million. The upgrades are also expected to cut transit times from Karachi to Peshawar by half. Pakistani railways currently account for 4% of freight traffic in the country, and upon completion of CPEC, Pakistani railways are expected to transport 20% of the country's freight traffic by 2025.

Upgrade plan
At the time of CPEC's announcement, the ML-1 consisted of mostly dual track railway between Karachi, and the Lahore suburb of Shahdara, with long stretches of single track. From Shahdara, the track mainly consisted of a single track until the city Peshawar. Construction works to dualize the entire track between Karachi to Shahdara were completed and inaugurated in January 2016. As part of the first phase of the CPEC railway project, the remaining stretch of track between Shahdara and Peshawar is to be upgraded to a dual track railway.

The first part of the expedited first phase of the project will focus on upgrading the Multan to Peshawar section, which will then be followed by the Hyderabad to Multan section, and finally by the Hyderabad to Karachi section.

The 676 kilometer portion between Lalamusa, north of Lahore, and Peshawar will require complete reconstruction with the addition of tunnels, culverts, and bridges, while over 900 kilometers south of Lalamusa towards Karachi will be upgraded to handle cars with a 25-ton axle load capacity. A spur from Taxila to Havelian will also be constructed, with a dry port to be established near the city of Havelian. Further, the entire length of track will have computerised signal systems, with stretches of track in urban areas to also be fenced off to prevent pedestrians and vehicles from crossing tracks in unauthorised areas.

In November 2022 the Pakistan and Chinese heads of state signed an agreement to being work on the line with Chinese financing. The Financial Times has reported criticism that the loans are a poor choice economically, especially with the state being under financial strain; however this has been countered that the upgrades are necessary with the risk of the railway system not functioning otherwise.

Stations
The stations on this line are as follows:

References

Railway stations on Karachi–Peshawar Line (ML 1)
5 ft 6 in gauge railways in Pakistan